The Harris School is a non-profit private pre-kindergarten through sixth grade school in Houston, Texas. The school caters towards children with mental, emotional, or behavioral challenges.

History 
The Harris School was established in 1987 as a therapeutic preschool, founded by a small group of child therapists and psychoanalysts. The school opened a facility in the Montrose area in 1997. In 2007, The Harris School became accredited through the Southern Association of Colleges and Schools. The school moved to its current location in Southwest Houston in 2013.

Program 
The school serves about 30 students with emotional, behavioral, or mental issues. It focuses on early-intervention programs. Typically a student may enroll in the school for three years and then re-enter a traditional school. In 2007, the school had 12 teachers.

References

External links

 

Private schools in Houston
Private middle schools in Texas
Private elementary schools in Texas
Educational institutions established in 1987
1987 establishments in Texas